The Man of the Year, is a 2003 Brazilian drama film produced and directed by José Henrique Fonseca. It stars Murilo Benício, Cláudia Abreu, and Natália Lage.

Plot
Maiquel (Murilo Benício) is a single, ordinary man living in the Baixada Fluminense region of Rio de Janeiro. After losing a soccer bet to his friends, Maiquel must dye his hair blond. This unusual event in his otherwise mundane life inspires Maiquel to ask his hairdresser, Cledir (Cláudia Abreu) out to a bar where he is confronted and bullied by a local criminal named Suel (Wagner Moura). He decides to settle the matter by subsequently buying a rifle which he uses to shoot and kill Suel the next day. He does so in front of Suel's girlfriend. Instead of reprimanding Maiquel, everyone in the neighborhood, including the police, is overjoyed that he has killed off this local pest and shows their gratitude with gifts. With the news of Maiquel's rise to heroism, influential locals hire him to kill others for him, turning him into a full-on hitman. Maiquel's once dull life becomes one filled with drugs, sex, wealth, and violence as he gradually becomes detached from his wife and becomes less of the "ordinary man" he once was. This path of destruction leads Maiquel to become an outlaw on the run. The film ends with Maiquel dying his hair black and running from the police, realizing just how much his life has changed.

Cast

Murilo Benício as Máiquel
Cláudia Abreu as Cledir
Natália Lage as Érica
Jorge Dória as Dr. Carvalho
Marcelo Biju as Neno
André Gonçalves as Galego
Lázaro Ramos as Marcão
Perfeito Fortuna as Robinson
Paulinho Moska as Enoque
Wagner Moura as Suel
André Barros as Marlênio
Carlo Mossy as delegado Santana
Mariana Ximenes as Gabriela
Amir Haddad as Gonzaga
José Wilker as Sílvio
Agildo Ribeiro as Zilmar

References

External links

The Man of the Year profile, San Francisco International Film Festival website

2003 drama films
2003 films
Brazilian drama films
Films directed by José Henrique Fonseca
Films set in Rio de Janeiro (city)
2000s Portuguese-language films